Butler Plaza is a large retail complex located in southwest Gainesville, Florida. It is the largest retail power center in Florida and among the largest in the southeast United States. Built on the former site of Stengel Airport, which closed in 1971, the shopping center currently consists of four major sections: Plaza, West, North and Butler Town Center.

The complex is named for the late Clark Butler, who developed the area along with his daughter, Deborah Butler. It is sometimes nicknamed the "Miracle Mile" and "Restaurant Row" due to the number of restaurants. It is bordered by 34th Street on the east, Interstate 75 on the west, and Archer Road on the south. Anchor stores include Lowe's, Wal-Mart, Target, Best Buy, Sam's Club, and two Publix supermarkets.

History 
In 1970, Clark Butler, president of Butler Enterprises, purchased a landing strip between I-75 and the University of Florida. This land became the site of the beginnings of Butler Plaza and the original 300,000 sq ft complex broke ground in 1971. Clark Butler, president of Butler Enterprises, was the developer on the project. Initial tenants included Woolco Department Store, Eckerd Drugs and Publix Markets. The plaza opened for business in 1972. In 1977, the complex was purchased by Canadian investors. In the mid-1980s, Butler's daughter Deborah joined Butler Enterprises. In the 1990s, the shopping center expanded along Archer Road.

In 2007, Butler announced plans to expand the shopping center to the north into  of vacant land, formerly occupied by a trailer park. In 2008, Butler Plaza was voluntarily annexed into the city of Gainesville. In 2008, the Butlers began working on expansion plans for the plaza and the creation of Butler Town Center. Clark Butler died in 2008 and Deborah continued the expansion. In 2013, the City Commission approved both land use and zoning amendments to the existing approved Butler Plaza expansion. The project broke ground in 2014 and Butler North opened in 2016. Butler Town Center opened in 2018 with several tenants, includingWhole Foods and P.F. Chang's as well as two apartment developments.

Butler Town Center 
Butler Town Center replaced the Butler East complex and consists of open-air retail space, apartments and a 13,000 sq feet chef driven food hall. It is anchored by a Regal Cinemas movie theater.

Tenants include:

 Whole Foods Market
 PF Chang's China Bistro
 CVS/pharmacy
 Bonefish Grill

Butler Plaza 
Butler Plaza is located directly adjacent to Butler Town Center and is anchored by a Best Buy, one of two Publix Grocery Stores in the shopping center, and several other medium-sized retailers.

Other tenants include
 OfficeMax
 Michaels
 PetSmart and Butler Plaza Animal Hospital
 Ross Dress for Less
 Trader Joe's
 Tuesday Morning
 AT&T Wireless
 Outback Steakhouse
 Jo-Ann Fabric & Crafts
McAlister's Deli
Chili's Grill & Bar

Butler Plaza West

Butler Plaza West is the westernmost section of the complex and is separated from Butler Plaza Central by Clark Butler Blvd. (formerly 37th Blvd). This section is anchored by a Target and a second Publix supermarket (formerly an Albertsons until 2008).

Other tenants include
 Old Navy
 Kirkland's
 GNC
 Rack Room Shoes
 Pollo Tropical

Butler North
Butler North opened in 2016. It is the northernmost section of the complex and is separated from Butler Plaza Central by Windmeadows Boulevard. Butler North's tenants include:
 Lowe's
 Sam's Club
 Dick's Sporting Goods
 Orangetheory Fitness
 Walmart
 Ashley HomeStore
 Five Below
 Aldi Supermarket
 Dollar Tree
 Total Wine & More
 Olive Garden
 Longhorn Steakhouse
 Culver's
 Jimmy John's Gourmet Sandwiches
 Bahama Breeze
 Marshalls

See also
 The Oaks Mall

References

External links
 Butler Plaza official site

Shopping malls in Florida
Buildings and structures in Gainesville, Florida
Tourist attractions in Gainesville, Florida